Neville Swan (23 January 1930 – 3 May 2012) was an Australian rules footballer who played with Collingwood in the Victorian Football League (VFL).

Notes

External links 		

		
		

1930 births
2012 deaths
Australian rules footballers from Victoria (Australia)		
Collingwood Football Club players